La Valise ou le Cercueil (English: "The suitcase or the coffin") is a 2011 French documentary about the Pied-Noirs who self-repatriated from French Algeria to mainland France after the Évian Accords at the end of the Algerian War. It was directed by Charly Cassan, who was awarded a knighthood in the Order of Academic Palms for the film.

References

French documentary films
French Algeria